The Parma MFD (Metal Fabricating Division) is a General Motors stamping and metal assembly plant located on the south side of Cleveland, Ohio in the suburb of Parma and a key part of the town's economic vibrancy.   The  plant supplies stamped metal parts and metal assemblies to numerous GM assembly plants located across North America, including specialized parts which have allowed it to continue to exist despite the downsizing of other auto industry plants.

References

External links
 GM Company Info - Parma Metal Center

Motor vehicle assembly plants in Ohio
General Motors factories
Parma, Ohio
Buildings and structures in Cuyahoga County, Ohio